Reginald Moss may refer to:

 Reginald Moss (cricketer) (1868–1956), English cricketer
 Reg Moss (1913–1995), Labour Member of Parliament for Meriden, 1955–1959